was a Japanese speed skater. He competed at the 1952 Winter Olympics.

References

External links

1927 births
2012 deaths
Japanese male speed skaters
Speed skaters at the 1952 Winter Olympics
Olympic speed skaters of Japan
People from Iwate Prefecture
20th-century Japanese people